Baron Grimston of Westbury, of Westbury in the County of Wiltshire, is a title in the Peerage of the United Kingdom. It was created in 1964 for the Conservative politician and former Deputy Speaker of the House of Commons, Sir Robert Grimston, 1st Baronet. He had already been created a baronet in 1952. Grimston was the son of Reverend Canon the Hon. Robert Grimston, third son of James Grimston, 2nd Earl of Verulam.  the titles are held by his grandson, the third Baron, who succeeded his father in 2003. 

The barony of Grimston of Westbury was one of the last hereditary baronies created in the Peerage of the United Kingdom.

Barons Grimston of Westbury (1964)
Robert Villiers Grimston, 1st Baron Grimston of Westbury (1897–1979)
Robert Walter Sigismund Grimston, 2nd Baron Grimston of Westbury (1925–2003)
Robert John Sylvester Grimston, 3rd Baron Grimston of Westbury  (b. 1951)

The heir presumptive is the present holder's brother the Hon. Gerald Charles Walter Grimston (b. 1953)

The heir presumptive’s heir apparent is his son, Edward Charles Luckyn Grimston (b.1985)

See also
Earl of Verulam

Notes

References
Kidd, Charles, Williamson, David (editors). Debrett's Peerage and Baronetage (1990 edition). New York: St Martin's Press, 1990, 

Baronies in the Peerage of the United Kingdom
Noble titles created in 1964
Noble titles created for UK MPs
Grimston family
Westbury, Wiltshire